Walker is a 1987 American-Mexican historical, hybrid/weird western film directed by Alex Cox and starring: Ed Harris, Richard Masur, René Auberjonois, Peter Boyle, Miguel Sandoval and Marlee Matlin. The film is based on the life story of William Walker, the American filibuster who invaded and made himself president of Nicaragua. It was written by Rudy Wurlitzer and scored by Joe Strummer, who has a small role as a member of Walker's army.

The film is intentionally full of postmodern anachronisms, such as: helicopters, Zippo lighters, automatic rifles, Diet Coke, magazines and cars. It was filmed in Nicaragua, during the Contra War (1979-1990).

Plot summary
In 1853, soldier-of-fortune William Walker flees Mexico, after a failed attempt to incite an armed insurrection. He is placed on trial by US officials, but wins acquittal on breaking the Neutrality Act. Walker is a firm believer in Manifest Destiny and has plans to marry and start a newspaper until his fiancée Ellen Martin dies of cholera. Financed by American multimillionaire Cornelius Vanderbilt, Walker and 60 mercenaries embark on a mission to bring stability to Nicaragua by assisting the Democratic Party in its civil war against the Legitimists. Doing so would secure Vanderbilt's rights over an overland shipping route between the Atlantic Ocean and the Pacific Ocean.

Despite significant losses, Walker and his corps score a bloody victory in Nicaragua, first in Rivas and then in the Conservative capital of Granada. In the midst of battle, Walker calmly strolls through the battlefield, seemingly unconcerned by the gunfire and death surrounding him. When the capital falls, Walker allows the President to stay in charge while the president's mistress, Doña Yrena, seduces Walker. After discovering that the President is attempting to rally other countries in Central America to unite and repel the Americans, Walker orders the President executed for treason and assumes the presidency for himself via a rigged election. From 1855 to 1857, his actions as president become increasingly manic and delusional, with Walker antagonizing his financial backer by revoking Vanderbilt's license to the overland trade route and seizing his ships. When one of Walker's brothers challenges his authority, Walker kills him without hesitation. Cut off from supplies and reinforcements, he decides to introduce slavery to Nicaragua in an attempt to gain support among the Southern U.S. states, causing the African-American members of his legion to quit in protest. The situation continues to deteriorate as neighboring countries invade Nicaragua. Yrena returns and attempts to convince Walker to stop the carnage - when he refuses, she attempts to kill him, but fails and is forced to run away. Incensed, Walker instructs his men to burn down the town. Taking refuge in the church, Walker gives one final speech to his few remaining men and the Nicaraguan prisoners, Staging that the day will never come where America will leave Nicaragua alone, as "it is America's destiny" to be there.

As Walker and his men exit the church, singing "Onward, Christian Soldiers", a helicopter arrives filled with American troops clad in modern-day military gear. A man from the helicopter explains that he has been ordered by the State Department to return all American citizens to their homeland. When he asks Walker what his nationality is, Walker replies "I'm William Walker, President of the Republic of Nicaragua," so he is left behind. The movie ends with Walker being executed on the beach by Honduran soldiers.

As the credits roll, a television screen displays various clips of President Ronald Reagan discussing the presence of U.S. troops in Nicaragua, the U.S. military conducting "training exercises" off the coast of Nicaragua, and a woman washing the dead bodies of Contras victims.

Cast

 Ed Harris as William Walker
 Richard Masur as E. G. Squier
 René Auberjonois as Major Siegfried Henningson
 Keith Szarabajka as Timothy Crocker
 Sy Richardson as Captain Hornsby
 Xander Berkeley as Byron Cole
 John Diehl as Stebbins
 Peter Boyle as Cornelius Vanderbilt
 Marlee Matlin as Ellen Martin
 Alfonso Arau as Gaston de Raousset-Boulbon
 Pedro Armendáriz, Jr. as Muñoz
 Gerrit Graham as Norvell Walker
 William O'Leary as James Walker
 Blanca Guerra as Doña Yrena
 Miguel Sandoval as Parker French
 Rick Barker as Breckenridge
 Karl Braun as Bruno von Natzmer
 Kathy Burke as Annie Mae
 Richard Edson as Turley
 Bennet Guillory as Achilles Kewen
 David Hayman as Father Rossiter
 Dick Rude as Washburn
 Zander Schloss as Huey
 Milton Selzer as Judge
 Edward Tudor-Pole as Doubleday
 Norbert Weisser as Prange
 Biff Yeager as Max / Carpetbagger
 Del Zamora as Padre Vigil
 Richard Zobel as Lemuel
 Joe Strummer as Faucet
 Fox Harris as District Attorney

Production
Alex Cox first visited Nicaragua in 1984, during the national election campaign for which Daniel Ortega became president, to see if conditions were as bad as the American media had reported. He discovered that this was not the case. The filmmaker was persuaded to return by two wounded soldiers from the Sandinista army. He later learned of the historical Walker from an article in Mother Jones that was largely about US foreign policy in Central America and decided to bring his story to the screen. A history professor at the University of California lent Cox a library card so he could do more research on Walker. "The more I read about him the more bizarre this seemed", Cox remembers. He hired Rudy Wurlitzer to write the screenplay because, according to Cox: "He understands American guys and the mad impulse that drives certain Americans to be great men." Cox was not interested in making what he called a long, respectful historical drama that would be shown on Masterpiece Theatre because Walker "leads a disastrous misadventure. He's a pretty bad guy. I didn't think it was possible to approach it in this normal, historical, respectful style."

The budget was set at six million dollars with most of the film being shot in Granada, Nicaragua. To get into character, Ed Harris led the entire cast in a 10-mile (16.1-km) forced march through the Nicaraguan countryside. The actor was drawn to the challenge of playing someone "who has incredible moral convictions but turns into such an evil person in the name of spreading democracy." He was also drawn to the script's politics, claiming to be anti-Contra and anti-intervention in Nicaragua and saw making a film there as a way to possibly stop the bloodshed.

Cox got the cooperation of the Sandinista government and the Roman Catholic Church because he wanted his production to be a "force for peace and reconciliation." The dying economy of Granada received a significant boost by the production with 300 local carpenters hired to build sets, 6,000 people hired as extras and army supplied security guards and a Soviet-built MI-18 transport helicopter used in the film. Electricity poles in the town plaza were torn down leaving homes without light. Some families were left temporarily without a telephone because the production needed their lines and the government could not afford to install new ones. The central square was covered with several inches of dirt to recreate 1850s conditions. The screenplay was edited by the country's Vice-President Sergio Ramirez and Minister of Culture Ernesto Cardenal, who were also a novelist and a poet respectively. Both men, along with the Minister of Education, the country's Interior Minister, and a military commander, would occasionally visit the set. Two people were accidentally killed during principal photography, both in separate vehicular-related incidents. For one of the deaths, the movie company paid for the funeral and compensated the family. The shooting conditions were difficult because of all of the fires the locals were building, making the air thick and hard to breathe.

Even after filming was over, Cox stayed in Granada, editing the film. He said: "I think we have kind of a duty not to just be the rich gringos and come down here and spend eight weeks and then disappear."

Historical accuracy
As noted by Roger Ebert in his review for the Chicago Sun-Times: "... anachronisms, guest stars, quixotic poker-faced heroes and utterly pointless scripts", were the hallmark of films helmed by Cox. There are a number of intentional anachronisms placed to draw comparison between 1850s and 1980s Nicaragua. For example, the characters are shown reading Newsweek and Time, and a computer monitor is visible in Vanderbilt's study. As the movie progresses, the inaccuracies become more and more extreme and it is evident that Cox was using the device to accentuate modern-day events with the Walker era.

Historical accuracy is done away with in a dramatic retelling of Walker's coup d'état. There is no evidence that Walker ever met Vanderbilt or received his support, as the movie suggests. Rather, Walker was supported by Vanderbilt's competitors, Charles Morgan and Cornelius Garrison, owners of the Nicaragua Transit Company in his time. James Buchanan is incorrectly mentioned as being the President of the United States after Walker's trial, prior to his Nicaraguan expedition. Franklin Pierce was actually the president at the time. Ellen Martin, Walker's fiancée, died in 1850. In the movie, she is present at his 1854 trial for violating US neutrality laws, after he invaded Baja California and Sonora Mexico, dying shortly thereafter.

Minor inconsistencies include use of bolt-action rifles, weapons from the World War I era, and Navy Colts in Walker's army, not in general use, until midway through the American Civil War, almost a decade later, but it was obvious that Cox was little concerned with historical accuracy.

Soundtrack

Joe Strummer had worked previously with Cox on Sid and Nancy and Straight to Hell, contributing songs to their respective soundtracks. He wanted to compose an entire score for a film and Walker afforded him such an opportunity. After filming his small part in the film, he would go back to his room and record bits of music onto a four-track cassette using an acoustic guitar and a little plastic synthesizer with guitarist Zander Schloss. They drew inspiration from local music played in bars – a mix of reggae, calypso and Brazilian music.

Reception
Walker originally garnered polarized reviews. Rita Kempley wrote that "it's gross as it is muddled as it is absurd" in her review for The Washington Post. Fellow Washington Post reviewer Desson Howe criticized the "perplexing fusion of cartoon and docudrama..." In his review for Newsweek, David Ansen wrote that "[Cox's] scenes have no shape, his characters are stick figures, the wit is undergraduate and his soggy set pieces of slow-motion carnage are third-rate Peckinpah imitations." Gene Siskel gave the film zero stars and called it "unquestionably one of the worst films of the year, made even more shocking because it was directed by the often inventive Alex Cox." Gene Siskel's cohost Roger Ebert also gave the film a rare zero-star rating and each critic gave it a thumbs down.

However Jay Scott gave the film a positive review in The Globe and Mail, arguing that "Cox exposes the limitations of historical drama in Walker with a calculated disregard of its conventions." Vincent Canby also praised Cox's film in The New York Times writing that "Walker is witty, rather than laugh-out-loud funny. Without being solemn, it's deadly serious... Walker is something very rare in American movies these days. It has some nerve." Jonathan Rosenbaum wrote in The Chicago Reader that the film was "all over the place and excessive, but as a radical statement about the U.S.’s involvement in [Nicaragua] it packs a very welcome wallop...One can certainly quarrel with some aspects of the film’s treatment of history, but with political cowardice in commercial filmmaking so prevalent, one can only admire this movie’s gusto in calling a spade a spade, and the exhilaration of its anger and wit." Jim Hoberman praised it in The Village Voice as "a superbly scurrilous and daringly self-destructive attack on the Reagan regime’s Central American policies (and the Monroe Doctrine as well). In his burlesque retelling the story of William Walker, 19th century “freebooter” who ruled Nicaragua, Cox refuses to recreate the past — or even dignify it." Ben Sachs in The Chicago Reader would later observe that the film's reputation had grown steadily since its release and was now regarded as "one of the key films of its era."

Director Alex Cox was never employed again by a major Hollywood studio, and his subsequent films have received only limited distribution in the United States. In a 2008 interview with The A.V. Club, Cox said: "Distribution is controlled by the studios, and I've been on the blacklist of the studios for the last 20 years... The last movie I was asked to direct was The Running Man... which was actually quite a good film, I thought. I would have liked to have done The Running Man. It was just that Walker happened at the same time."

On Rotten Tomatoes, Walker presently holds a rating of 47% from 15 reviews.

Awards
Walker was nominated for the Golden Bear at the 38th Berlin International Film Festival.

Home media releases
Criterion released a Region 1 DVD on February 19, 2008 with features that include: an audio commentary by Cox and screenwriter Wurlitzer; Dispatches from Nicaragua, an original documentary about the filming of Walker; On Moviemaking and the Revolution, reminiscences 20 years later from an extra on the film; behind-the-scenes photographs; and a booklet featuring writings by film critic Graham Fuller, Wurlitzer and Linda Sandoval.

On January 18, 2022, Criterion announced that Walker will be receiving a Region A Blu-ray upgrade on April 12, 2022. The upgraded release will include all of the 2008 DVD's special features along with a "restored high-definition digital transfer, [and an] uncompressed monaural soundtrack," approved by the film's director. Also included are two short films by Cox, Walker 2008 and On the Origins of “Walker,” and a trailer for the film.

See also

Cult film
Postmodernist film
List of films featuring the deaf and hard of hearing

References

Bibliography

 Doubleday, Charles William. Reminiscences of the Filibuster War in Nicaragua. New York: G.P. Putnam’s Sons, 1886. .
 Harrison, Brady. William Walker and the Imperial Self in American Literature. Athens, Georgia: University of Georgia Press, 2004. .

External links
 
 
 
 
 Walker page on Alex Cox website
 Film Comment interview with Joe Strummer
 Senses of Cinema essay on Walker
Walker: Apocalypse When? an essay by Graham Fuller at the Criterion Collection

1987 films
1980s biographical films
American biographical films
American satirical films
Mexican biographical films
American Western (genre) films
1987 Western (genre) films
English-language Mexican films
Spanish biographical films
English-language Spanish films
1980s English-language films
Films directed by Alex Cox
Films set in the 1850s
Films set in Nicaragua
Films shot in Nicaragua
Postmodern films
Films set in 1853
Films set in 1855
Films set in 1857
1980s American films
1980s Mexican films
Mexican Western (genre) films